Bit-na (pronounced and sometimes romanised Bin-na) is a Korean feminine given name. Unlike most Korean given names, it is not composed of Sino-Korean morphemes which can be written with hanja, but is an indigenous Korean word: the root form of the Korean verb binnada, meaning "to shine".

People with this name include:
Binna Choi (born 1977), South Korean curator in the Netherlands
Wang Bit-na (born 1981), South Korean actress
Park Bit-na (born 1985), South Korean figure skater
Lee Bit-na (born 1995), South Korean actress

Fictional characters with this name include:
Geum Bit-na, portrayed by Jeon Hye-bin in 2013 South Korean television series Queen of the Office
Oh Bit-na, portrayed by Lee Jin in 2013 South Korean television series Shining Romance
Yoo Bit-na, portrayed by Z.Hera in 2017 South Korean television series School 2017
Oh Bit-na, portrayed by Yang Hyeji in 2021 South Korean Netflix series Nevertheless

See also
List of Korean given names

References

Korean feminine given names